Luis Antonio Chavez (died April 13, 2010) was a Honduran journalist and host of a children's radio program.

Information
Chavez was shot and killed on April 13, 2010, aged 22, becoming the sixth Honduran journalist to be killed in the country since March 1, 2010.

References

2010 deaths
Assassinated Honduran journalists
Male journalists
Honduran radio journalists
Year of birth missing